
Gmina Wieleń is an urban-rural gmina (administrative district) in Czarnków-Trzcianka County, Greater Poland Voivodeship, in west-central Poland.

Villages
Apart from the town of Wieleń, Gmina Wieleń contains the villages and settlements of Biała, Dębogóra, Dzierżążno Małe, Dzierżążno Wielkie, Folsztyn, Gieczynek, Gulcz, Hamrzysko, Herburtowo, Kałądek, Kocień Wielki, Kuźniczka, Marianowo, Mężyk, Miały, Nowe Dwory, Rosko, Wrzeszczyna and Zielonowo.

Neighbouring gminas
Gmina Wieleń is bordered by the gminas of Czarnków, Człopa, Drawsko, Krzyż Wielkopolski, Lubasz, Trzcianka and Wronki.

References
Polish official population figures 2006

Wielen
Czarnków-Trzcianka County